The 1990 NCAA Division III Men's Ice Hockey Tournament was the culmination of the 1989–90 season, the 7th such tournament in NCAA history. It concluded with Wisconsin-Stevens Point defeating Plattsburgh State in the championship series 1-0 in the deciding minigame. All Quarterfinals matchups were held at home team venues, while all succeeding games were played in Stevens Point, Wisconsin.

Qualifying teams
The following teams qualified for the tournament. There were no automatic bids, however, conference tournament champions were given preferential consideration. No formal seeding was used while quarter and semifinal matches were arranged so that the road teams would have the shortest possible travel distances. Because the semifinal series were played at home team venues the NCAA elected to select an equal amount of eastern and western teams.

Format
The tournament featured three rounds of play. Starting in 1988, each round of the tournament consisted of a two-game series where the first team to reach 3 points was declared a winner (2 points for winning a game, 1 point each for tying). If both teams ended up with 2 points after the first two games a 20-minute mini-game used to determine a winner.  Mini-game scores are in italics. The teams were seeded according to geographic proximity in the quarterfinals so the visiting team would have the shortest feasible distance to travel.

Bracket

Note: * denotes overtime period(s)Note: Mini-games in italics

Record by conference

References

External links
Division III Men's Ice Hockey Record Book

 
NCAA Division III ice hockey